Adrienn Henczné Deák (Budapest, 1890 – Budapest, 1956) was a Hungarian painter. The Hungarian National Gallery hosts her oil painting "Csendélet".

References 

1890 births
1956 deaths
20th-century Hungarian painters
20th-century Hungarian women artists
Hungarian women painters
Artists from Budapest